The Andrew Dickson White House, commonly referred to as the "A.D. White House," is a High Victorian Gothic house on the campus of Cornell University, designed by William Henry Miller and Charles Babcock. It houses the Cornell University Society for the Humanities.

The house was commissioned in 1871 by Andrew Dickson White, co-founder and first president of the university. The house is richly decorated with stone carvings according to White's tastes, intended to remind students of men's accomplishments and inspire them to higher purpose and an appreciation of beauty. White left the house to the university for the perpetual use of its later presidents. Presidents still use the study on the southeast side of the building as a private office/retreat.

In 1953, the house was renovated for use as the University Art Museum, and its carriage house converted into what is now the Big Red Barn, a graduate student lounge. It served in this role until 1973, and was considered for demolition. Henry Guerlac, Director of the university's Society for the Humanities, led the cause to prevent its destruction and have it placed on the National Register of Historic Places in 1973. The house library is now called the Guerlac Room in his honor. Since the construction of a new Johnson museum, the house has been used for offices of the Humanities Society.

References

External links
 

Houses on the National Register of Historic Places in New York (state)
William Henry Miller buildings
Andrew Dickson White
University and college dormitories in the United States
Cornell University buildings
Houses completed in 1871
Houses in Tompkins County, New York
University and college buildings on the National Register of Historic Places in New York (state)
National Register of Historic Places in Tompkins County, New York
1871 establishments in New York (state)